The Spectre is a 2010 short animated film, directed by Joaquim Dos Santos and written by Steve Niles. Gary Cole played Detective Jim Corrigan, whose suspects are brought to justice by his alter-ego, the Spectre. The film, which was released on February 23, 2010, as a bonus feature on the Justice League: Crisis on Two Earths DVD, was the first of the DC Showcase series and was included on the compilation DVD DC Showcase Original Shorts Collection in an extended version.

Plot
Foster Brenner, a successful film producer, is killed by a bomb hidden underneath the diving board of his swimming pool. Los Angeles Police Department detective Jim Corrigan, who was having a relationship with Foster's daughter Aimee, starts investigating despite the case having been assigned to another officer. Jim interviews Flemming, Brenner's butler, who shows him security footage of two men in ski masks entering the complex and placing the bomb. Jim asks if Brenner had any enemies, and Flemming replies that any man so wealthy and powerful has many. He tells him that several of Brenner's longtime collaborators were excluded in his latest films and were very unhappy about it.

That night at a special effects warehouse, a man named Drew Flynn sees a man who looks like the deceased Foster, who accuses him of his murder and transforms into the Spectre. The Spectre uses his powers to animate the models and animatronic film monsters to attack Flynn, and kills him with a gigantic gorilla robot. The Spectre then confronts and kills another suspect, Peter McCoy, by controlling his car and crushing him with it, before taking a suitcase of money McCoy was fleeing with.

Arriving at Aimee's house undetected by phasing through the wall, Jim tells Aimee that she is good enough to be an actress in her father's movies. Learning that Aimee was responsible for giving the correct access code for her father's estate to Flynn and McCoy, Jim opens the briefcase and shows her the money. Aimee tries to distract Jim by asking if they can still be together while taking a pistol out of a desk drawer, but Jim refuses. Aimee then shoots at him, but the bullets pass harmlessly through his body. Jim coldly states that he's already dead before transforming into the Spectre. When Aimee attempts to flee, the Spectre kills her by trapping her in a cyclone of money, causing her to bleed to death from being repeatedly sliced and scarred.

With his vengeance now complete, Jim transforms back and calmly walks away as the police arrive. The movie ends with Jim narrating that his job is to root out evil, that he is justice, and that he is the Spectre.

Cast
 Gary Cole as Jim Corrigan / The Spectre
 Alyssa Milano as Aimee Brenner
 Jeff Bennett as Foster Brenner, Peter McCoy, Flemming
 Rob Paulsen as Drew Flynn, Lt. Brice, Deandre
 Jon Polito as Police Captain

References

External links

 
 
 Justice League: Crisis on Two Earths @ The World's Finest

2010 animated films
2010 short films
2010 direct-to-video films
S
Films based on works by Jerry Siegel and Joe Shuster
2010s American animated films
2010s direct-to-video animated superhero films
Animated superhero films
Patricide in fiction
Warner Bros. Animation animated short films
2010s Warner Bros. animated short films
Films directed by Joaquim Dos Santos
2010s English-language films
American animated short films
2010s superhero films
American direct-to-video films
Warner Bros. direct-to-video films
Warner Bros. direct-to-video animated films